The Romanian National Opera, Bucharest is one of the four national opera and ballet companies of Romania.  The company is headquartered in Bucharest, near the Cotroceni neighbourhood.

History
In 1877, Romanian government regulation stipulated the formation of an opera company under the auspices of the Romanian National Theatre.  On 8 May 1885, the Compania Opera Română (Romanian Opera Company) gave its first performance.  The Romanian composer, conductor, singer and teacher George Stephănescu (1843-1925) was the founding director of this company.  In 1921, the company was formally established as an independent institution, with subsequent funding that oscillated between direct government funding and funding from private individuals.  The first production by the newly formalized company was of Wagner's Lohengrin, conducted by George Enescu.

In 1953, a new theatre for opera and ballet was constructed for two international festivals that occurred in July and August 1953, the Third World Youth Congress, and the fourth World Festival of Youth and Students. The opera company gave its first performance in this theatre on 9 January 1954, Tchaikovsky's The Queen of Spades. On the next night, the first ballet performance of the company took place at the same theatre, of Coppélia.

The building of the Romanian Opera in Bucharest is listed in the National Register of Historic Monuments.

In July 2021, the company announced the appointment of Eitan Schmeisser as its next artistic director.

See also
 List of concert halls
 List of opera houses
 Opera in Romania

References

External links
 Official Romanian-language website of Opera Naţională București

Culture in Bucharest
Romanian music
Bucharest
Buildings and structures in Bucharest
Historic monuments in Bucharest
Opera
Bucharest
Music venues completed in 1954